The Ministry of Religious Affairs and Wakfs is a ministry of Algeria. Its head office is in Hydra, Algiers.

Ministers
Several ministers have succeeded in this ministerial post in successive :

See also

References

External links
 Ministry of Religious Affairs 

Islam in Algeria
Religious affairs
Algeria